Sergei Nikolayevich Lavrentyev (born 9 April 1972) is a Russian professional football coach and a former player.

Playing career
As a player, he made his debut in the Soviet Second League in 1989 for FC Dynamo-2 Moscow.

He played five games for German club FC Einheit 1990 Wernigerode in the 1992–93 NOFV-Oberliga Mitte.

Coaching career
Lavrentyev coached CSP Izmailovo of the Russian Women's Football Championship from February 2011 until October 2012, when he took the job as Russia women's national football team coach.

References

1972 births
People from Klimovsk
Living people
Soviet footballers
Russian footballers
FC Moscow players
Russian football managers
FC Arsenal Tula players
Russia women's national football team managers
FC Dynamo Moscow reserves players
Association football forwards
Sportspeople from Moscow Oblast